Ellen Maria Carpenter ( – ) was an American landscape and portrait painter.  

She was educated at Milford High School and studied art under Thomas Edwards and Lowell Institute in Boston. She later studied under Tony Robert-Fleury in Europe.

She painted numerous landscapes and was noted for her depictions of the White Mountains of New Hampshire. She travelled extensively and painted scenes from California, Algeria, Egypt, Italy, and Spain.  Walter Shaw Sparrow wrote that her "landscape art reveals at times the menacing suggestion of great rivers and of high solitary mountains."

Ellen Maria Carpenter died on July 1, 1908 in Boston.

References 

Created via preloaddraft
1830 births
1908 deaths
American women painters
People from Killingly, Connecticut
19th-century American painters
20th-century American painters